Grevillea biternata is a species of flowering plant in the family Proteaceae and is endemic to the south-west of Western Australia. It is a shrub with divided leaves with linear lobes and clusters of white flowers.

Description

Taxonomy
Grevillea biternata was first formally described in 1845 by Carl Meissner in Johann Georg Christian Lehmann's Plantae Preissianae from specimens collected by James Drummond in the Swan River Colony. The specific epithet (biternata) means "twice-ternate", referring to the three leaflets of each leaf.

Distribution and habitat
This grevillea grows in heath or mallee-woodland between New Norcia, Northampton, Wubin and Wongan Hills in the Avon Wheatbelt, Geraldton Sandplains, Jarrah Forest and Swan Coastal Plain bioregions of south-western Western Australia.

Conservation status
Grevillea biternata is listed as "not threatened" by the Department of Biodiversity, Conservation and Attractions.

References

biternata
Endemic flora of Western Australia
Eudicots of Western Australia
Proteales of Australia
Taxa named by Carl Meissner